Grigory Vasilyevich Romanov (scientific transliteration: Grigorij Vasil'evič Romanov; 7 February 1923 – 3 June 2008) was a Soviet politician and member of the Politburo and Secretariat of the Communist Party of the Soviet Union. In 1985, he was considered Mikhail Gorbachev's main rival in the succession struggle after the death of Konstantin Chernenko in March 1985, the third Soviet leader to die in just a few short years.

Early life and career 

Romanov was born in Novgorod Oblast into a Russian peasant family.

A soldier in the Red Army during the Great Patriotic War, Romanov joined the Communist Party of the Soviet Union (CPSU) in 1944. Romanov graduated from the Leningrad Shipbuilding Institute in 1953, and became a designer in a shipyard. He fulfilled several important posts in the party committee of the enterprise he was working at and later in the Leningrad city and regional party committees. In September 1970 he was elected First Secretary of the Communist Party Committee of the Leningrad Region. In this position he gained a reputation of being a good organizer and well versed in economic matters, winning defense investment for Leningrad. He was elected a member of the Central Committee of the Communist Party of the Soviet Union at the XXIVth congress of the CPSU in 1971. He became a candidate member of the Central Committee's Politburo in 1973 and a full member in 1976. In 1977 he initiated a successful vote to remove Chairman of the Presidium of the Supreme Soviet, Nikolai Podgorny from the Politburo.

Secretary of the Central Committee 

In 1983 Romanov attracted the attention of the new General Secretary Yuri Andropov, who subsequently brought him to Moscow and helped promote him in June 1983 to the very prestigious and influential post of a secretary of the Central Committee of the CPSU responsible for industry and the military-industrial complex. During the few remaining months of Andropov's life Romanov was widely seen as one of Andropov's closest collaborators and was an ardent supporter of Andropov's comprehensive program for the reform, renewal and further development of socialism in the Soviet Union and beyond, a fact which stands in sharp contrast to the picture Gorbachev and his associates were later to paint of Romanov as a means of gaining advantage in the power struggles following Andropov's death in February 1984.

Romanov attracted international attention on November 5, 1983, during the height of Operation Able Archer. He addressed the Kremlin Palace of Congresses in order to commemorate the October Revolution, where he remarked:

Western analysts, unaware of the Exercise that was taking place and therefore uncertain as to why Romanov would describe the situation as "white hot", dismissed the remarks as Soviet propaganda.

During Konstantin Chernenko's short time in office as General Secretary in 19841985, Romanov already occupied a position clearly inferior to Gorbachev, who had been styled Second Secretary of the Central Committee since February 1984 and acted as chairman of the Politburo, Secretariat and Central Committee in the course of Chernenko's long periods of absence due to his illness.

Gorbachev vs. Romanov 
Romanov was the second youngest member of the Politburo after Gorbachev. In the months preceding the death of Konstantin Chernenko in March 1985,  Romanov and Gorbachev were commonly regarded to be chief rivals in the succession struggle for the post of General Secretary. Viktor Grishin was also considered a viable candidate.

However, after Chernenko's death Gorbachev emerged with the strongest position to succeed Chernenko. Andrei Gromyko, one of the oldest and widely respected Politburo members, nominated Gorbachev for the position of General Secretary of CPSU, both at the March 11 meeting of Politburo and subsequently at the March 1985 Plenum (meeting) of the Central Committee of the CPSU. Neither Romanov nor Grishin mounted a formal challenge to Gorbachev's bid and the votes in favor of Gorbachev, both in the March 11 meeting of Politburo and at the March Plenum, were unanimous.

End of career 

Gorbachev quickly moved to oust Romanov following his ascent to become General Secretary. He informed him that he had no future under Gorbachev, and sacked him three months later. Romanov was forced to retire from the Politburo on 1 July 1985. 

Romanov subsequently lived as a pensioner in Moscow. For several years he headed the "Association of Leningradians in Moscow".

References

Archie Brown. The Gorbachev Factor. Oxford University Press, 1997.

External links
A Soviet War Veteran Speaks Out Pro-Romanov account of the battle to succeed Chernenko

1923 births
2008 deaths
Burials at Kuntsevo Cemetery
Central Committee of the Communist Party of the Soviet Union members
People from Novgorod Oblast
Politburo of the Central Committee of the Communist Party of the Soviet Union members
Soviet military personnel of World War II
Soviet politicians